Luxury Disease is the tenth studio album by Japanese rock band One Ok Rock, released on September 9, 2022 through Fueled by Ramen, and produced by Rob Cavallo.

Background
On June 24, 2022, the band announced new album Luxury Disease set to be released on September 9. According to vocalist Taka, the album's title is an English translation of their first album title Zeitakubyo, as they felt similar uncertainty about something. "We're making a fresh start with the experience we've gained in the US. I remembered when we released our first album in Japan, Zeitakubyo, we were in a similar situation where we felt uncertain about lots of things. So we've translated Zeitakubyo into English to show we've determined to do our best on the world stage."

Composition and lyrics
In an Apple Music commentary, Taka stated that the album marks a change from a pop style of the previous album to a more rock-centered sound as the band wanted to bring back  the essence of rock music. "Save Yourself" is the album's first track, and its lyrics urges one to leave when love hurts deep. The second song, "Neon", giving off Panic! at the Disco vibe as Brendon Urie helped the band co-wrote the song. It tells about neon-lit city Shibuya, which known as one of a major nightlife area in Japan. The third track, "Vandalize", is an upbeat song, brings back the band's emo sound with some Japanese rock-inspired melodies. One Ok Rock explores musical and operatic rock on the fourth track, "When They Turn the Lights On", combining the sound of Queen and My Chemical Romance. "Let Me Let You Go" is the album's fifth track, a pop rock song co-written by 5 Seconds of Summer drummer Ashton Irwin, telling about someone who can't return the affection of the person who loves him until the relationship ends without any effort to prevent it. Next track "So Far Gone" is a heartbreaking song, about someone trying to be strong after losing the precious one. "Prove" is a motivational song, co-written by Bring Me the Horizon keyboardist Jordan Fish, reflects a person's determination to continue to grow and never give up after experiencing failure. "Mad World" is a more personal track to vocalist Taka, depicts the problems he encountered when he was 15 years old. The Japanese version of the song has the most Japanese lyrics out of the album, with only one sentence in English.

The album's ninth track, "Free Them", features guest vocal Teddy Swims, tells about the desire to release the emotions that have been kept. An alternative rock/pop rock song of the album, "Renegades", co-written by Ed Sheeran and Coldrain vocalist Masato Hayakawa, conveying an urgent message that calls into question about the current state of affairs in the world, and an anthem for the renegades refusing their battles and passions to be ignored. "Outta Sight" is an upbeat song, while "Your Tears are Mine" is a ballad with the reminiscent of Queen's rock sound. The last track of the International edition album, "Wonder", has a classic rock epic vibe with big drum fills and arena-ready chords. The Japanese edition of Luxury Disease add the songs "Broken Heart of Gold" and "Gravity". "Broken Heart of Gold" is a melodic ballad song, implying someone who is desperate with the situation and forces himself to endure it. The last track, "Gravity", features Official Hige Dandism vocalist Satoshi Fujihara. Its lyrics tells about someone determined not to falling for the same wrong person.

Singles and release
The first single "Renegades" was released on April 16, 2021, used as the theme song for the live-action film Rurouni Kenshin: The Final. The film also uses the second single from the album, "Broken Heart of Gold", for Rurouni Kenshin: The Beginning, released on May 27, 2021. Third single "Wonder" which had performed live in 2020, released on October 22, 2021. In 2022, the fourth single "Save Yourself" was released on June 24 along with the music video and announcement of the album's title and release date. The fifth single "Let Me Let You Go" was released on August 29 alongside an accompanying music video. The sixth single from the album, "Vandalize" was released three days prior to the release of the album on September 6, 2022. The censored version of the song featured as one of the ending themes on the soundtrack for Sonic Frontiers, a video game in Sega's long-running Sonic the Hedgehog franchise.

Track listing

Personnel
One Ok Rock
 Takahiro "Taka" Moriuchi – vocals
 Toru Yamashita – guitar
 Ryota Kohama – bass guitar
 Tomoya Kanki – drums

Charts

Weekly charts

Monthly charts

Year-end charts

Certifications

References

External links 
 

2022 albums
One Ok Rock albums
Fueled by Ramen albums
Albums produced by Rob Cavallo